John Terence Doyle (born November 2, 1985) is an American former professional baseball pitcher. He pitched for the Fukuoka SoftBank Hawks of Nippon Professional Baseball.

College career
Doyle attended Salem High School in Salem, New Hampshire, where he was twice named The Eagle-Tribunes Player of the Year. He then attended Boston College, where he played for the Boston College Eagles squad.

In 2006 and 2007, Doyle played collegiate summer baseball for the Yarmouth–Dennis Red Sox of the Cape Cod Baseball League, where he was named an all-star and was co-recipient of the league's outstanding pitcher award in 2006. Doyle was selected by the Los Angeles Dodgers in the 21st round of the 2007 MLB Draft, but he returned to college for his senior year in order to improve his draft stock.

Professional career
The Chicago White Sox selected Doyle in the 37th round of the 2008 MLB Draft, even though he sported a 5.87 earned run average (ERA) over 69 innings pitched for the Eagles in his senior season. The Sox then assigned Doyle to the Rookie Class Bristol White Sox in 2008, as he gained promotions to the Great Falls Voyagers (2009), Kannapolis Intimidators (2010) and Winston-Salem Dash (2010–2011), before joining the Double-A Class Birmingham Barons in the 2011 midseason, where he had a 7–5 win–loss record with a 3.07 ERA and 73 strikeouts in 15 starts, walking only 22 batters in 100 innings of work. He later pitched for the Mesa Solar Sox in the Arizona Fall League in the 2011 fall season.

At the 2011 Winter Meetings, the Minnesota Twins selected Doyle in the Rule 5 draft. He struggled with the Twins during the 2012 spring training and was sent back to the White Sox. Through June 2012, Doyle posted a 6–3 record with a 2.83 ERA for the Charlotte Knights of the Class AAA International League, but the White Sox released Doyle to allow him to pitch in Nippon Professional Baseball for the Fukuoka SoftBank Hawks.

In November 2012, Doyle returned to the United States after signing a minor league deal with the Boston Red Sox that included an invitation to the 2013 spring training. He then pitched for the Pawtucket Red Sox and Portland Sea Dogs during the regular season. In between, Doyle played winter ball in the Mexican Pacific League with the Aguilas de Mexicali in 2013, and for the Cardenales de Lara club of the Venezuelan League in 2014. He then opened 2015 with the Bowie Baysox, the Class AA affiliate of the Baltimore Orioles. In 26 games (21 starts) between Double-A Bowie and Triple-A Norfolk, Doyle went 16–2 with a 2.16 ERA. Over  innings, he gave up 137 hits with just 22 walks and 110 strikeouts. He went 12–1 with a 1.97 ERA for Bowie. In seven Norfolk starts, Doyle was 4–1 with a 2.57 ERA. He elected free agency on November 6, 2015. He signed a minor league contract with the Baltimore Orioles on December 12, 2015 and he was assigned to the Norfolk Tides for the 2016 season on December 29, 2015.

On May 10, 2016, Doyle signed with the Lancaster Barnstormers of the Atlantic League of Professional Baseball. On August 26, 2016, Doyle signed a minor league deal with the Arizona Diamondbacks. He reported to the Mobile BayBears of the Class AA Southern League. He became a free agent after the season

Scouting report
Doyle's fastball does not have great velocity. As a result, he throws his two-seam fastball more often than his four-seam fastball. He also has a curveball, slider, and changeup. Doyle relies on control of his pitches.

Coaching career
Doyle was named head coach of the New England College baseball team in January 2019.

Personal life
Doyle majored in math at Boston College. Due to dermatitis, he returned to college during his senior year to obtain his teaching credentials. During the offseason, Doyle worked as a substitute teacher and rotated between three high schools located in Warwick, Rhode Island.

See also
Rule 5 draft results

References

External links

Pura Pelota – Venezuelan Professional Baseball League

1985 births
Living people
Águilas de Mexicali players
American expatriate baseball players in Japan
American expatriate baseball players in Mexico
Baseball pitchers
Baseball players from Massachusetts
Baseball players from New Hampshire
Birmingham Barons players
Boston College alumni
Boston College Eagles baseball players
Bowie Baysox players
Bristol White Sox players
Cardenales de Lara players
American expatriate baseball players in Venezuela
Charlotte Knights players
Fukuoka SoftBank Hawks players
Great Falls Voyagers players
Gwinnett Braves players
Kannapolis Intimidators players
Lancaster Barnstormers players
Mesa Solar Sox players
Mississippi Braves players
Mobile BayBears players
New England College Pilgrims
Nippon Professional Baseball pitchers
Norfolk Tides players
Pawtucket Red Sox players
People from Concord, Massachusetts
People from Salem, New Hampshire
Portland Sea Dogs players
Sportspeople from Middlesex County, Massachusetts
Winston-Salem Dash players
Yarmouth–Dennis Red Sox players